Baldini is a surname of Italian origin. Notable people with this surname include:

Andrea Baldini (born 1985), Italian foil fencer
Antonella Baldini (born 1966), Italian voice actress
Baccio Baldini (1436– 1487), Italian engraver
Christian Baldini (born 1978), Italian/Argentine/American composer and conductor
Elvezia Michel-Baldini (1887–1963), Swiss painter
Emmanuele Baldini (born 1971), Italian violinist and conductor
Enrico Baldini (born 1996), Italian footballer 
Ercole Baldini (born 1933), Italian road-racing bicyclist and Olympic medalist
Francesco Baldini (born 1974), Italian footballer
Franco Baldini (born 1960), Italian footballer and football technical director
Giuseppe Baldini (1922–2009), Italian footballer and manager
Jean-Pierre Baldini (born 1949), French sculptor
Luca Baldini (born 1976), Italian swimmer
Luisa Baldini (born ?), Australian-born UK journalist and presenter
Marco Baldini (born 1959), Italian television personality and radio host
Maria Teresa Baldini (born 1961), Italian politician, physician and basketball player
Marino Baldini (born 1963), Croatian politician
Nanni Baldini (born 1975), Italian voice actor
Oreste Baldini (born 1962), Italian actor and voice actor
Pietro Paolo Baldini (1614?–1684?), Italian painter of the Baroque era
Raffaello Baldini (1924–2005), Italian writer and poet
Renato Baldini (1921–1995), Italian film actor
Sebastiano Baldini (1615–1685), Italian poet, librettist, and satirist
Silvio Baldini (born 1958), Italian football manager
Stefano Baldini (born 1971), Italian Olympic marathon runner
Tiburzio Baldini (fl. early 17th century), Italian painter of the Baroque era
Umberto Baldini (1921–2006), Italian art historian and restoration specialist
Vittorio Baldini (died 1618), Italian printer and engraver

Fictional characters
Guglielmo Baldini, hoax entry in the 1980 edition of The New Grove Dictionary of Music and Musicians

Other
Baldini & Castoldi, Italian publishing company founded in 1897 (name changed to Dalai Editore in 2011)

See also

Italian-language surnames